The Maple River is an  tributary of the Le Sueur River in southern Minnesota in the United States.  Via the Le Sueur, Blue Earth and Minnesota rivers, it is part of the watershed of the Mississippi River.

The river received its name from the groves of maple trees lining its banks.

Course
The Maple River flows from Penny Lake in northwestern Freeborn County and initially follows a generally northwestward course through northeastern Faribault and southern Blue Earth counties. It turns northward in Blue Earth County and passes the town of Good Thunder.

See also
List of rivers of Minnesota

References

Rivers of Minnesota
Rivers of Blue Earth County, Minnesota
Rivers of Faribault County, Minnesota
Rivers of Freeborn County, Minnesota
Tributaries of the Mississippi River
Le Sueur River